Julio César Vásquez (born July 13, 1965) is an Argentine retired professional boxer best known to have held a WBA junior middleweight title.

Amateur record
Vasquez had an amateur record of 33-2.

Professional career

Vasquez, known as "El Zurdo" which means lefty as he is a southpaw, turned pro in 1986 and captured the Vacant WBA Light Middleweight Title by KO'ing little-known Hitoshi Kamiyama in 1992. He successfully defended the title ten times beating such boxers as Javier Castillejo, Aaron Davis, Tony Marshall and the then-undefeated future-great: Winky Wright during his championship reign before losing the belt to the legendary Pernell Whitaker in 1995 who had only one fight in this weightclass.

That same year he recaptured the WBA Light Middleweight Title by beating fellow southpaw Carl Daniels whom he knocked out with a single straight left after trailing badly on points. The devastating 11th-round knockout of Daniels was named Ring Magazine Knockout of the Year for 1995.

He lost the belt in his next fight to Laurent Boudouani by KO and never contended again. Although he never had another major title shot, Vasquez continues to fight in his native Argentina, fighting as recently as 2007 in the super middleweight (168lb) division and has a current win–loss record of 68 wins, 13 losses.

Professional boxing record

See also
List of world light-middleweight boxing champions

References

External links

 

|-

1966 births
Living people
Argentine male boxers
Sportspeople from Santa Fe, Argentina
Middleweight boxers
Super-middleweight boxers
World light-middleweight boxing champions
World Boxing Association champions